Data Interchange Standards

 EDIMAR Electronic data interchange for the European Maritime industry (engineering data)
 MTML data interchange standard for purchasing - see Maritime E-Commerce Association (MECA)
 SFI Coding and Classification System provides a functional subdivision of technical and financial ship or rig information
 Shipdex A modified subset of S1000D to transfer technical data typically used in equipment manuals

Data interchange platforms

 SafeSeaNet: the European platform for maritime data exchange

Encryption Standards

 S-63 standard for encrypting, securing and compressing electronic navigational chart (ENC) data.

External links
 MTML
 Shipdex
 IDABC European eGovernment Services SafeSeaNet
 International Hydrographic Office document S-63

Data interchange standards
Maritime transport